Colwich may refer to:

 Colwich, Kansas, United States
 Colwich, Staffordshire, England
 Colwich rail crash